In digital computing, hardware security bugs are hardware bugs or flaws that create vulnerabilities affecting computer central processing units (CPUs), or other devices which incorporate programmable processors or logic and have direct memory access, which allow data to be read by a rogue process when such reading is not authorized.  Such vulnerabilities are considered "catastrophic" by security analysts.

Speculative execution vulnerabilities
Starting in 2017, a series of security vulnerabilities were found in the implementations of speculative execution on common processor architectures which effectively enabled an elevation of privileges.

These include:
 Foreshadow
 Meltdown
 Microarchitectural Data Sampling
 Spectre
 SPOILER
 Pacman

Intel VISA
In 2019 researchers discovered that a manufacturer debugging mode, known as VISA, had an undocumented feature on Intel Platform Controller Hubs, which are the chipsets included on most Intel-based motherboards and which have direct memory access, which made the mode accessible with a normal motherboard possibly leading to a security vulnerability.

See also 
 Hardware security
 Security bug
 Computer security
 Threat (computer)

References 

Computer security exploits
Hardware bugs
Side-channel attacks
2018 in computing